The Misadventures of Hedi and Cokeman is a 2021 French film directed by Julien Hollande, written by Julien Hollande and Nassim Lyes and starring Nassim Lyes, Fred Testot and Julie Ferrier.

Synopsis

In Paris, two dysfunctional drug dealers use family ties to try and boost their business.

Cast 
 Nassim Lyes as Cokeman
 Fred Testot
 Julie Ferrier
 Hedi Bouchenafa as Hedi
 Julie Maes as Voisine de derrière
 Aymen Rahoui
 Ali Damiche

Soundtrack
ِThe soundtrack album peaked at number 5 in the French Albums Chart and also charted in Belgium and Switzerland. All album tracks are by producer Kore in collaboration with artists indicated below:

Sadek - "Gambas"
Lacrim - "Mango"
Timal - "Cramé"
Heuss L'Enfoiré - "Gucci Versace"
Stavo feat. Ashe 22 - "Balafre"
Ninho - "Mon poto"
PLK - "Pas bien"
Gazo - "Message groupé"
RK - "Mañana"
Vald- "Baby"
Da Uzi - "Perdu"
Kore - Hedi, Cokeman "Interlude"
Soso Maness feat. Nahir - "Lewandowski"
Zola - "Adelanto"
Leto - "On ira loin"
Lyonzon - "Astrid Chanel Elodie"
Naza - "Nouvelle séquence" 
Luv Resval, Alkpote - "Célébration 2"
Doria, Sifax - "Tout va vite" 
Kalash Criminel - "Netflix"
Werenoi - "Tucibi"
Zoupouti, Fetiche - "Zone 6"

References

External links
 
 

2021 films
French crime comedy films
2020s French-language films
French-language Netflix original films
2020s French films
French action comedy films